Tippy Walker (born February 19, 1947) is an American former actress, best known for her role in the film The World of Henry Orient (1964).

Born Elizabeth Tipton Walker in New York City, her father was an engineer with Allied Chemical Corporation. She attended The Masters School in Dobbs Ferry, New York.

After appearing in several television shows, such as Doctor Kildare and Peyton Place, and the female lead role in the film Jennifer on My Mind (which featured a young Robert De Niro), she retired from acting and opened an art gallery called "Out Of The Blue", near the Yale University campus.

Filmography
The World of Henry Orient (1964) - Valarie 'Val' Campbell Boyd
The Jesus Trip (1971) - Anna
Jennifer on My Mind (1971) - Jenny

Television
Dr. Kildare (4 episodes, 1965) - Lois Gibbon
ABC Stage 67 (1 episode, 1966) - Virginia Otis
Peyton Place (79 episodes, 1968-1969) - Carolyn Russell
Seven in Darkness (1969) - Christine Rohas
The Sixth Sense (later edited for syndication to become part of The Night Gallery by Rod Serling) (1 episode, 1972) - Julie Desmond (final television appearance)

Notes

External links
 

1947 births
Living people
Actresses from New York City
American child actresses
American film actresses
American television actresses
Actresses from New Haven, Connecticut
20th-century American actresses
21st-century American women